ALL.Net (Amusement Linkage Live Network)  is an arcade video game network communication system and digital distribution system made by Sega Corporation. It is similar to the Taito NESiCAxLive game distribution systems and NESYS arcade network; the player smart card system is similar to the Konami e-AMUSEMENT system.

Development
ALL.net was developed by Sega in 2004. It was created as a method of allowing players to save player profiles, player rankings, high scores, create online rankings and have competitive online play. The system was based on the previous VF.net created by Sega for Virtua Fighter 4 in 2001. Initially the service was only available in Japan, but following a trial in Hong Kong in 2008 the service has been extended to other parts of Asia in 2010. The system has been rolled out to South Korea, Taiwan, Singapore, China.

ALL.Net was further developed as ALL.Net P-ras to allow digital distribution of arcade games, as well as for software updates. ALL.Net P-ras allows profit sharing with the arcade operators, with Sega renting games for free, while the operator pays the cost of the hardware, with all revenues from players being split between Sega and the arcade operator.

ALL.Net games
See List of ALL.Net games

See also
 Digital distribution in video games
 List of Sega arcade system boards

External links
  

Products introduced in 2004
2004 establishments in Japan
Products introduced in 2010
Internet properties established in 2004
Sega hardware
Video game distribution
Online content distribution
Online video game services